David W. Lewis (1815-1885) was an American lawyer, civil servant and lecturer.

born in 1815 in Hancock County, Georgia. After graduating from the University of Georgia in 1837 he pursued careers as a lawyer, an agricultural reformer, and a planter. One of his first roles in public service began in 1839 as secretary to Georgia governor George N. Gilmer. He is also known for his service in the Congress of the Confederate States during the Civil War. In 1873 Lewis became the first president of North Georgia Agricultural College, an institution now formally known as the University of North Georgia. In addition to his service as president at the college, Lewis was also one of the two professors at the school in its early years, teaching Greek and English literature.

Lewis fell ill in the during the fall of 1885. In his final days he relocated to the house of his daughter, H. H. Perry, in Gainesville, Georgia. He died on December 18, 1885, and was buried at Mount Hope Cemetery in Dahlonega.

References

1815 births
Members of the Confederate House of Representatives from Georgia (U.S. state)
19th-century American politicians
1885 deaths
People from Lumpkin County, Georgia
People from Hancock County, Georgia
University of Georgia alumni